Following is an incomplete list of past and present Members of Parliament (MPs) of the United Kingdom whose surnames begin with L.  The dates in parentheses are the periods for which they were MPs. 

Stephen Ladyman
Eleanor Laing
Jacqui Lait
Norman Lamb
George Lambert, 1st Viscount Lambert
George Lambert, 2nd Viscount Lambert
Antony Lambton
Alexander Baillie-Cochrane
David Lammy
Norman Lamont
Mark Lancaster
Ian Lang
George Lansbury
Andrew Lansley
Peter Law
Jackie Lawrence
David Laws
Jack Lawson
Nigel Lawson
Robert Laxton
Mark Lazarowicz
Jennie Lee
John Leech
Hastings Lees-Smith
Barry Legg
Harry Legge-Bourke
R. C. Lehmann
Edward Leigh
David Lepper
Chris Leslie
Oliver Letwin
Tom Levitt
Ivan Lewis
Julian Lewis
Matthew Lewis
Terence Lewis
Helen Liddell
Ian Liddell-Grainger
David Lidington
Simon Lightwood
Peter Lilley
Martin Linton
Michael Livesey
Ken Livingstone
Richard Livsey, Baron Livsey of Talgarth
John Llewellin, 1st Baron Llewellin
Gwilym Lloyd George, 1st Viscount Tenby
Megan Lloyd George
Selwyn Lloyd
Tony Lloyd
Elfyn Llwyd
David Lock
Charles William Vane, 3rd Marquess of Londonderry
Michael Lord
Robert Reid, 1st Earl Loreburn
Tim Loughton
Andy Love
Evan Luard (1966–1970), (1974–1979)
Eric Lubbock, 4th Baron Avebury
Caroline Lucas
Henry Lucas
Ian Lucas
Peter Luff
Iain Luke
Lawrence Lumley, 11th Earl of Scarbrough 
Nicholas Lyell
Liz Lynne
Alex Lyon
John Lyons
Alfred Lyttelton
Oliver Lyttelton, 1st Viscount Chandos

 L